George Leonard Trapp (July 1894 – November 12, 1917) was a Canadian flying ace during World War I.

He was born in New Westminster, British Columbia, the son of Thomas John Trapp, was educated at McGill College and joined the Royal Navy Air Service (RNAS) in 1916, serving with No. 10 Naval Squadron. He claimed his first three victories flying Sopwith Triplanes in August 1917 and two more victories in September while flying Sopwith Camels. Trapp was killed in action in November when he was shot down by Bruno Justinius of Bavarian Jasta 35. He had claimed one more victory that morning before being shot down in the afternoon.

His two brothers Stanley Valentine Trapp and Donovan Trapp also died while serving with the RNAS: Donovan was killed in action and Stanley Valentine died during a test flight. Another brother Thomas saw action at the front and returned after being seriously wounded.

Raymond Collishaw married Trapp's sister Neita.

References

External links 
 

1894 births
1917 deaths
Canadian World War I flying aces
McGill University alumni
Royal Naval Air Service personnel of World War I
Royal Naval Air Service aviators
British military personnel killed in World War I